Robert Lamar Goff (born October 2, 1965) is a former professional American football player for the New Orleans Saints of the National Football League. The defensive lineman was a fourth-round draft pick in the 1988 NFL Draft by the Tampa Bay Buccaneers out of Auburn.

1965 births
Living people
Sportspeople from Rochester, New York
American football defensive linemen
Auburn Tigers football players
Butler Grizzlies football players
Tampa Bay Buccaneers players
New Orleans Saints players
Minnesota Vikings players